Roger Cuthbert Quilter (1 November 1877 – 21 September 1953) was a British composer, known particularly for his art songs. His songs, which number over a hundred, often set music to text by William Shakespeare and are a mainstay of the English art song tradition.

Biography 

Quilter was born in Hove, Sussex; a commemorative blue plaque is on the house at 4 Brunswick Square. He was a younger son of Sir William Quilter, 1st Baronet, a wealthy noted landowner, politician and art collector.

Roger Quilter was educated first in the preparatory school at Farnborough. He then moved to Eton College and later became a fellow-student of Percy Grainger, Cyril Scott and H. Balfour Gardiner at the Hoch Conservatory in Frankfurt, where he studied for almost five years under the guidance of the German professor of composition Iwan Knorr. Quilter belonged to the Frankfurt Group, a circle of composers who studied at the Hoch Conservatory in the late 1890s.

His reputation in England rests largely on his songs and on his light music for orchestra, such as his Children's Overture, with its interwoven nursery rhyme tunes, and a suite of music for the play Where the Rainbow Ends. He is noted as an influence on several English composers, including Peter Warlock.

Quilter enjoyed a fruitful collaboration with the tenor Gervase Elwes until the latter's death in 1921. In November 1936, Quilter's opera Julia was presented at Covent Garden by the British Music Drama Opera Company under the direction of Vladimir Rosing. It ran for only seven performances. Heavily revised, it was later published as Love at the Inn.

As a homosexual, he found it difficult to cope with some of the pressures which he felt were imposed upon him, and eventually deteriorated into mental illness after the loss of his nephew Arnold Guy Vivian during the Second World War.

He died at his home on 21 September 1953, in St John's Wood, London, a few months after celebrations to mark his 75th birthday, and was buried in the family vault at St Mary's Church, Bawdsey, Suffolk.

Songs 
Roger Quilter's output of songs, more than one hundred in total, added to the canon of English art song that is still sung today. According to Valerie Langfield, his style "was indisputably English" despite his German training, and once matured around 1905, did not develop further. Shakespeare, Herrick, and Shelley were his favoured poets. Among the most popular are "Love's Philosophy", "Fair House of Joy", "Come Away Death", "Go, Lovely Rose", "Weep You No More", "By the Sea", and his setting of "O Mistress Mine". Quilter's setting of verses from the Tennyson poem "Now Sleeps the Crimson Petal" is one of his earliest songs but is nonetheless characteristic of the later, mature style.

Of his seventeen Shakespeare settings, the Three Shakespeare Songs of 1905 are perhaps the most successful: commenting on 'O Mistress Mine' Peter Warlock said the song is "one of the very few things that very simply send me into ecstasies every time I play it". While a collection rather than a true song cycle, Seven Elizabethan Lyrics is "probably the best single volume of songs the composer ever produced", according to Michael Pilkington, and includes the still regularly performed "Fair House of Joy" as its final song. But perhaps his most widely known work is Non Nobis, Domine (1934). This was written for the Pageant Of Parliament at the Royal Albert Hall July 1934, to a text by Rudyard Kipling, and has become the school song or school hymn of countless girls' schools all over the English-speaking world. He also published the Arnold Book of Old Songs, a collection of 16 folk and traditional songs from England, Ireland, Scotland, Wales and France to new accompaniments, dedicated to his nephew Arnold Guy Vivian.

Selected works 
Four Songs of the Sea, Op. 1 (1901) (revised, omitting first song, as Three Songs of the Sea (1911)
 Four Songs of Mirza Schaffy Op. 2 (1903) (revised 1911)
Three Shakespeare Songs, Op. 6 (1905)
To Julia, Op. 8 (texts of Robert Herrick) (1905)
Seven Elizabethan Lyrics, Op. 12 (1908)
Three English Dances, Op. 11 (1910)
Three Studies for Piano, Op. 4 (1910)
Where the Rainbow Ends (incidental music) (1911)
 Four Child Songs, Op.5 (1914) (revised 1945)
A Children's Overture (1914)
Three Pastoral Songs, Op. 22 (1920)
Five Shakespeare Songs, Op. 23 (1921)
The Fuschia Tree, Op. 25 No. 2 (1923)
Five Jacobean Lyrics, Op. 28 (1926)
Five English Love Lyrics, Op. 24 (1922–28)
 Four Shakespeare Songs, Op. 30 (1933)
 Julia, light opera (1936) (includes the concert waltz Rosme and the gavotte In Georgian Days). Revised as Love at the Inn (1940)
Arnold Book of Old Songs (1921, 1942, pub. 1950)

References

Further reading 
 Banfield, Stephen (1985). Sensibility and English Song, Cambridge University Press, Cambridge, 
 Harrison, Nicola (2016). The Wordsmith's Guide to English Song: The Songs of Roger Quilter, Compton Publishing, 
 Hold, Trevor (1976 and 1996). The Walled in Garden: The Songs of Roger Quilter, Thames Publishing,

External links 

 Roger Quilter Homepage
 
 
 

1877 births
1953 deaths
20th-century classical composers
20th-century English composers
20th-century British male musicians
20th-century British musicians
English classical composers
English male classical composers
English gay musicians
Hoch Conservatory alumni
LGBT classical composers
Light music composers
Musicians from Sussex
People educated at Eton College
People from Hove
Pupils of Iwan Knorr
Younger sons of baronets
19th-century British LGBT people
20th-century LGBT people